Anne-Sophie Barthet (born 23 February 1988) is a French World Cup alpine ski racer and soldier.  She competed for France at four Winter Olympics and five World Championships.

Born in Toulouse, Haute-Garonne, Barthet made her World Cup debut at age 17 in October 2005. Her best Olympic result is fourteenth in the giant slalom in 2014.  She has eleven top tens on the World Cup (six in slalom, four in combined, and one in giant slalom), with her best result being a third place podium finish in combined at Soldeu 

In the downhill at Aspen in December 2007, Barthet dislocated her knee in a heavy fall, and was out of competition for eleven months.  2018 Winter Olympics, she was injured in a fall twenty minutes prior to the combined event, and fractured her fibula, which kept her out of competition for eight months. Barthet was selected for the 2019 World Championships, despite not obtaining a result from her two World Cup starts in late January; she secured a start in the combined competition after a victory in a combined race on the Europa Cup circuit in early December. In an interview at the World Championships, she said that they would be her last, although she had not decided the exact date of her retirement.

World Cup results

Season standings

Race podiums
 1 podium – (1 SC); 11 top tens

World Championship results

Olympic results

References

External links
 
Anne-Sophie Barthet World Cup standings at the International Ski Federation

French Ski Team – 2019 women's A team 
Anne Sophie Barthet at Head Skis
 

1988 births
Living people
French female alpine skiers
Olympic alpine skiers of France
Alpine skiers at the 2006 Winter Olympics
Alpine skiers at the 2010 Winter Olympics
Alpine skiers at the 2014 Winter Olympics
Universiade medalists in alpine skiing
Sportspeople from Toulouse
Universiade silver medalists for France
Medalists at the 2009 Winter Universiade